The Charities Act 2011 (c 25) is a UK Act of Parliament. It consolidated the bulk of the Charities Act 2006, outstanding provisions of the Charities Act 1993, and various other enactments.

Repeals
Legislation repealed in its entirety by the 2011 Act include the Recreational Charities Act 1958, Charities Act 1993, Charities (Amendment) Act 1995, Charities Act 1993 (Substitution of Sums) Order 1995, Charities Act 2006 (Charitable Companies Audit and Group Accounts Provisions) Order 2008, and Charities (Pre-consolidation Amendments) Order 2011.  Amendments were made to other legislation. It replaces most of the Charities Act 1992 and Charities Act 2006.

See also
English trust law
Charitable trusts in English law

Notes

References
JE Martin, Hanbury & Martin: Modern Equity (19th edn Sweet & Maxwell 2012) ch 15

External links
Charities Act 2011

United Kingdom Acts of Parliament 2011
Charity law
Charity in the United Kingdom